Etowah High School may refer to:

 Etowah High School (Georgia), United States
 Etowah High School (Alabama), United States
 Etowah High School (Tennessee), United States